Bagahi  is a Village Development Committee in Rautahat District in the Narayani Zone of south-eastern Nepal. At the time of the 1991 Nepal census it had a population of 2217 people residing in 429 individual households.

References

Populated places in Rautahat District